The 1926–27 Chicago Black Hawks season was the team's first season. Chicago was awarded an NHL franchise. Most of the team's players came from the Portland Rosebuds of the Western Canada Hockey League, which had folded the previous season. The team would qualify for the playoffs in their first season, but lost in a 2-game total goal series.

Coffee tycoon Frederic McLaughlin bought the team from the syndicate who had been awarded the franchise by the NHL. McLaughlin had been a commander with the 333rd Machine Gun Battalion of the 86th Infantry Division during World War I. This division was nicknamed the "Black Hawk Division", after a Native American of the Sauk nation, Chief Black Hawk, who was a prominent figure in the history of Illinois.  McLaughlin evidently named the team in honor of the military unit, and his wife, Irene Castle, designed the team's logo.

The team faced immediate competition from Eddie Livingstone's rival Chicago Cardinals of the American Hockey Association (AHA) which also played in the Coliseum. Both teams gave away tickets in droves and engaged in a price war. Under the financial strain, and pressure brought to bear on the AHA by the NHL, the Cardinals folded before the end of the season. The Black Hawks would sign away several of the Cardinals' players.

Regular season

November
The Hawks would play their first ever game on November 17, 1926, at the Chicago Coliseum, defeating the Toronto St. Pats by a 4–1 score before an overflow crowd of 7,000 (the capacity was normally 6,000). Tex Rickard, who had orchestrated the start-up of the New York Rangers, organized the first game as a major social event, similar to the Rangers' own first home game. The game was a benefit, with proceeds going to a junior ice hockey league. The Black Hawks first goal was scored by George Hay at 3:30 of the first period. Hay scored a goal 50 seconds later at 4:20 to lead the team with two goals, while goaltender Hugh Lehman made 36 saves in the win.

Chicago would win their next game over the Boston Bruins to improve to 2–0–0, however, the club dropped their next three games, including their first ever road game, which was a 4–3 overtime loss to the New York Rangers on November 30.

The Black Hawks had a 2–3–0 record in November, earning four points. Chicago was in a fourth place tie with the Boston Bruins in the five team American Division, four points behind the first place New York Rangers.

December
Chicago began December with a 2–2 tie with the New York Americans, ending their three-game losing skid, as Rabbit McVeigh scored a goal late in the third period. On December 4, the Black Hawks ended their four-game winless streak with a 5–3 win over the Montreal Maroons at the Montreal Forum. This was the first road victory for the club.

The Black Hawks would drop their next two games, however, on December 11, Hugh Lehman allowed no goals in a 3–0 win over the Montreal Canadiens to earn the first shutout in club history. This kicked off a three-game winning streak, as the Black Hawks would defeat the New York Americans and New York Rangers. Following a 3–1 loss to the Montreal Canadiens on December 22, the Black Hawks would win their final two games of the month, including a 2–0 shutout win over the Detroit Cougars on Christmas Day. On December 29, the Black Hawks overcame a 4–0 deficit to defeat the Montreal Maroons 5–4 in overtime.

Chicago earned a record of 6–3–1 during the month of December, bringing their overall record to 8–6–1, earning 17 points. The Black Hawks were in first place in the American Division at the end of the month.

January
The Black Hawks lost their first two games of January, including a 4–0 loss to the New York Rangers on New Year's Day, dropping them out of first place in the American Division. Chicago returned to the win column on January 8, with a 4–0 win over the Pittsburgh Pirates, however, the Hawks would follow up the victory with two more losses, dropping them under .500 with a 9–10–1 record.

Chicago would win a thrilling overtime contest against the Toronto St. Pats, as Gord Fraser scored the winner to lead the Hawks to a 4–3 win over the St. Pats on January 19. The next night, the Black Hawks tied the Boston Bruins 2–2, however, the club would lose their last three games of January.

Chicago earned a record of 2–6–1 in January, dropping their overall record to 10–12–2, earning 22 points. The Black Hawks slid back in the standings, as the fell to fourth place in the American Division.

February
February began with two more losses, extending the Black Hawks losing streak to five games. The club snapped their losing skid with a 5–3 win over the best team in the NHL, the Ottawa Senators. Two nights later, on February 11, the Black Hawks easily defeated the Montreal Canadiens 6–1.

The Black Hawks lost their next two games, including a 2–1 overtime loss to the New York Americans and a 3–0 shutout loss to the Boston Bruins, dropping their record to 12–17–2. Chicago ended the two game losing skid with a very solid 4–1 win over the Detroit Cougars, then won their next game by a 3–1 score against the New York Americans. Chicago dropped their final game of February in overtime, losing 2–1 to the Montreal Maroons.

Chicago finished February with a 4–6–0 record in ten games. The Black Hawks overall win–loss record dropped to 14–18–2, earning 30 points, however, Chicago moved past the Pittsburgh Pirates and into third place in the American Division.

March
The Black Hawks started March off with a 3–0 shutout victory over the New York Rangers, as Hugh Lehman stopped all 31 shots he faced, leading Chicago to the win over the division leading team. In their next game, the Montreal Canadiens destroyed the Black Hawks, winning 7–1, which set the most goals allowed in a game by the club.

On March 5, the Black Hawks faced another tough opponent, visiting the league leading Ottawa Senators, however, the Black Hawks upset the Senators on an overtime goal by Rabbit McVeigh, as Chicago won 2–1. The Hawks won their next two games on the road, defeating the Detroit Cougars 4–1 and the Boston Bruins 4–0, bringing their overall record to 18–19–2.

Chicago returned home on March 15, however, the Bruins came out on top with a 2–1 win over the Hawks to end their three-game winning streak. The Hawks dropped their next game 6–2 to the Pittsburgh Pirates. Chicago finished the month with a win over the Pirates, a tie with a Cougars, and a loss to the New York Rangers.

The Black Hawks earned a 5–4–1 record in March, which marked the second time in the season that the club had a winning month. The Black Hawks would lead the league in goals scored with 115, however, they would also allow a league-high 116 goals, en route to a 19–22–3 record, good for third place in the American Division.

Babe Dye would lead the team with 25 goals, while Dick Irvin would have a club best 36 points, and finish second in the NHL scoring race by a single point to Bill Cook of the New York Rangers.  Percy Traub would lead the Black Hawks with 93 penalty minutes.

Season standings

Record vs. opponents

Schedule and results

Playoffs
Chicago would earn a spot in the playoffs and face the Boston Bruins in a 2-game total goal series.  The Bruins would win the opening game by a 6–1 score, while the teams would play to a 4–4 draw in the 2nd game, giving the Bruins the series win with a 10–5 total score, and ending the Black Hawks first season.

Boston Bruins 10, Chicago Black Hawks 5

Player statistics

Regular season
Scoring

Goaltending

Playoffs
Scoring

Goaltending

Note: GP = Games played; G = Goals; A = Assists; Pts = Points; +/- = Plus/Minus; PIM = Penalty Minutes; PPG=Power-play goals; SHG=Short-handed goals; GWG=Game-winning goals
      MIN=Minutes played; W = Wins; L = Losses; T = Ties; GA = Goals against; GAA = Goals against average; SO = Shutouts;

See also
 1926–27 NHL season

References
 
Notes

External links
 SHRP Sports
 The Internet Hockey Database
 National Hockey League Guide & Record Book 2007

Chicago Blackhawks seasons
Chicago
Chicago